In the United States, presidential job approval ratings were first conducted by George Gallup (estimated to be 1937) to gauge public support for the president of the United States during their term. An approval rating is a percentage determined by polling which indicates the percentage of respondents to an opinion poll who approve of a particular person or program. Typically, an approval rating is given to a politician based on responses to a poll in which a sample of people are asked whether they approve or disapprove of that particular political figure. A question might ask: "Do you approve or disapprove of the way that the current president is handling their job as president?"

Like most surveys that measure opinions, individual poll results may be inaccurate. Many unscientific approval rating systems exist that show inaccurate statistics. Examples that self select, such as online questions are of this type; however, the aggregate approval rating is generally accepted by statisticians as a statistically valid indicator of the comparative changes in the popular United States mood regarding a president.

George W. Bush registered a 90% job approval rating (the highest in Gallup's tracking) shortly after the September 11, 2001, terrorist attacks. Harry Truman registered a 22% job approval rating (the lowest in Gallup's tracking) in a Feb. 9-14, 1952, Gallup poll.

President Joe Biden's approval ratings

Historical Gallup polling comparison

Approval at the beginning of the presidency

Graphs

See also 
 Historical rankings of presidents of the United States
 Opinion polling on the Donald Trump administration
 Opinion polling on the Ronald Reagan administration

Notes

References

External links 
 "Historical Presidential Job Performance Ratings". Roper Center.
 "Trump approval ratings" . FiveThirtyEight.
 "Midterm Presidential Approval Ratings" . Data360.
 "President Job Approval Ratings". PresidentPollsUSA.
 "Historical Presidential Approval Ratings 1945–2009". The Wall Street Journal.
 "President Obama's Ongoing Job Approval". (CongressRatings)

presidential approval rating
presidential approval rating
Historical rankings of public figures
Rating